Pelevikha is a rural locality (a village) in Vozhegodskoye Urban Settlement, Vozhegodsky District, Vologda Oblast, Russia. The population was 1 as of 2002.

Geography 
Pelevikha is located 9 km southeast of Vozhega (the district's administrative centre) by road. Okulovskaya-1 is the nearest rural locality.

References 

Rural localities in Vozhegodsky District